Saliente is a barrio in the municipality of Jayuya, Puerto Rico. Its population in 2010 was 649.

See also

 List of communities in Puerto Rico

References

External links

Barrios of Jayuya, Puerto Rico